Jenni Blong, sometimes credited as Jeni Blong or Jenny Blong, is an actress who has worked in American film, television, and theater. She has guest starred in a variety of television series, including Big Love, True Blood, Lost, The Booth at the End, and Fringe. She has also had small roles in the films Cry-Baby, 200 Cigarettes, S1m0ne, and Finding Amanda.

Career

Theater
In 1998, Blong appeared as Honey in New Century Theatre's production of Who's Afraid of Virginia Woolf. The Daily Hampshire Gazette praised the actress, writing that "although her portrayal is occasionally too mannered, over all, [she] does well portraying Honey as a fragile simp with a dirty secret." Also in 1998, Blong starred as Ophelia in The Circle Hamlet, an interpretation of Shakespeare's Hamlet. It was the first production by new theater company Public Domain.

Television and film
Blong had a role in the 1990 film Cry-Baby, co-starring Johnny Depp.

Beginning in 1999, Blong has done guest starring, single appearances in a number of American television series, including NYPD Blue, The Guardian, The District, Cold Case, 24, ER, and Ghost Whisperer. Blong received a major role in the HBO drama series Big Love as Evie, for which she appeared in five episodes. Over a four year period, starting in 2008, Blong played Michelle Stackhouse in another HBO series, True Blood. She also appeared in a 2010 episode of the television series Lost.

In the 2010 episode "Peter" of the science fiction series Fringe, Blong guest starred as Dr. Carla Warren, the tragic lab assistant of Walter Bishop (John Noble). She returned in the 2012 episode, "Black Blotter", as a hallucination of Walter's. Den of Geek called her performance "striking" and "undoubtedly sexy, but cold in a decidedly powerful way,"

Since 2011 Blong has portrayed waitress Doris in the first and second seasons of the science fiction drama series The Booth at the End. The Huffington Post was pleased that she returned for the second season, writing that she played the role "promisingly." Series creator Christopher Kubasik believed that Blong "has one of the hardest jobs in that show because basically her little scenes are these little quick quirky blackout sessions with almost no substance of clarity about what’s going on underneath. Everything is implied and everything that’s implied is only suggestion. It’s that vague. And she rocked the house every time and I will be grateful forever for her."

Filmography

References

External links

Living people
American film actresses
Place of birth missing (living people)
American television actresses
Year of birth missing (living people)
21st-century American women